Renée Gauthier was one of the first women to be involved in surrealism. 

A close friend of Benjamin Péret, Gauthier took part in the hypnotic sleep experiments organized by René Crevel in 1922-3. She contributed an account of a dream, starting “I am in a field with Jim”, to the first issue of La Révolution surréaliste in December 1924.

Works
 'Rêve' [Dream], La Révolution surréaliste, No. 1 (December 1924)

References

External links
 Le rêve de Renée Gauthier dans la Révolution surréaliste

Year of birth unknown
Year of death unknown
French surrealist writers
French surrealist artists
Women surrealist artists